The Saint-Omer Open is an annual men's professional golf tournament played at Saint-Omer Golf Club in Saint-Omer, France. The tournament was founded in 1997 and was part of the MasterCard Tour a year later, before taking its place on the Challenge Tour for the 2000 season.

In 2003 it also became an official money event on the European Tour, but since it was played during the same week as the U.S. Open, one of golf's four major championships, the Tour's leading players were not available to play and as such, it had the smallest purse available on the European Tour. It was removed from the European Tour schedule in 2014 but remained on the Challenge Tour.

Winners

Notes

References

External links

Coverage on the Challenge Tour's official site

Former Challenge Tour events
Former European Tour events
Golf tournaments in France
Recurring sporting events established in 1997
Sport in Pas-de-Calais
Saint-Omer
1997 establishments in France